Telegraph Creek Airport  was located near to Telegraph Creek, British Columbia, Canada.

See also
Telegraph Creek Water Aerodrome

References

External links

Defunct airports in British Columbia
Regional District of Kitimat–Stikine